Mercy (Dancing for the Death of an Imaginary Enemy) is the band Ours' third major label release. The album was recorded with renowned record producer Rick Rubin over several years, and was released on April 15, 2008.  Music videos have been made for "Live Again", "God Only Wants You", and "The Worst Things Beautiful". Also, "Murder" has been background music for a commercial for CSI.

"Ran Away to Tell the World" was featured in the second part of the NCIS backdoor pilot episode for NCIS Los Angeles.

The album leaked to the internet on March 7, 2008.

Track listing
"Mercy" - 6:41
"The Worst Things Beautiful" - 4:21
"Ran Away to Tell the World" - 5:00
"Black" - 4:51
"Moth" - 4:34
"Murder" - 5:35
"God Only Wants You" - 4:23
"Live Again" - 4:27
"Willing" - 4:41
"Saint" - 5:06
"Lost" - 5:18
"Get Up" - 4:50

Engineers:  Peter Katis & Jon Berman

Recorded at: The Mansion

Mixers: Jonathan Florencio, Tim Palmer

Mastered by: Ted Jensen

References

2007 albums
Ours (band) albums
American Recordings (record label) albums
Albums produced by Rick Rubin
Albums recorded at The Mansion (recording studio)